Bayou Meto is a tributary of the Arkansas River in the U.S. state of Arkansas. Its headwaters are at Wilson Hill, in Faulkner County, Arkansas a few miles east of Camp Robinson State Wildlife Management Area.

Bayou Meto is a habitat for a wide variety of fish, waterfowl, mammals and reptiles.

See also
List of rivers of Arkansas
Arkansas River

References

Arkansas River
Rivers of Faulkner County, Arkansas
Rivers of Arkansas County, Arkansas
Rivers of Arkansas